Marin Gaşpar (born 15 August 1917) is a Romanian boxer who competed in the 1936 Summer Olympics.

In 1936 he was eliminated in the first round of the bantamweight class after losing his fight to Wilhelm Stasch.

References

External links
  

1917 births
Possibly living people
Bantamweight boxers
Olympic boxers of Romania
Boxers at the 1936 Summer Olympics
Romanian male boxers